Stig Andersson (10 November 1924 – 11 July 2015) was a Swedish cyclist. He competed in the 4,000 metres team pursuit at the 1952 Summer Olympics.

References

External links
 

1924 births
2015 deaths
Swedish male cyclists
Olympic cyclists of Sweden
Cyclists at the 1952 Summer Olympics
People from Varberg Municipality
Sportspeople from Halland County